Air Sweden, also known as Time Air Sweden, was a short-lived airline from Sweden that operated from 1991 to 1993.

History
The airline was established as LBF-Eda Varken in 1955 and operated taxi flights. It was renamed to Abal Air in 1982 and Time Air Sweden in 1990. Air Sweden was set up as a charter airline because the airline market in Sweden had not yet been deregulated. The airline operated cargo flights with its single Douglas DC-8-71F on the route Ostend-Stockholm-Delhi.

The airline was owned by the Swedish businessman and former owner of Transwede, Thomas Johansson, with the main creditor being GE Capital. When GE Capital canceled the credits in 1993, the airline went bankrupt. This was due to the high losses related to an economic downturn in Sweden, as well as the purchase of two Lockheed L-1011 TriStars.

Parts of the airline were later used to form West Air Sweden, specifically the single IAI Westwind that was left after the first one crashed. There is no connection between Time Air Sweden and the more recent airline Air Sweden.

Fleet

See also
 Airlines
 Transport in Sweden

References

Defunct airlines of Sweden
Airlines established in 1991
Airlines disestablished in 1993
Swedish companies established in 1991
Swedish companies disestablished in 1993